John Hugh Arnold (born 28 November 1969) is a British historian. Since 2016, he has been the Professor of Medieval History at the University of Cambridge. He previously worked at Birkbeck College, University of London, where he specialised in the study of medieval religious culture. He has also written widely on historiography and why history matters.

Career
Born 28 November 1969, Arnold received his Bachelor of Arts degree in history and his Doctor of Philosophy degree in medieval studies from the University of York. He was professor of medieval history at Birkbeck College, University of London, from 2008. He joined the college as a lecturer in 2001. Before that he was a lecturer at the University of East Anglia. He is a member of the Social History Society and the Medieval Academy of America.

Research
Arnold specialises in the study of medieval religious culture, saying that while he has never been a believer in any religion, "belief" has always fascinated him. In his work he asks "Why do people believe the things they believe? What does 'believing' really mean in practice?" Arnold has also written widely about historiography. In 2008 he wrote a policy paper, Why history matters - and why medieval history also matters, for History & Policy.

Selected publications
What is Masculinity? Historical Dynamics from Antiquity to the Contemporary World (Palgrave, 2011), co-edited with Sean Brady
What is Medieval History? (Polity, 2008)
Belief and Unbelief in Medieval Europe (Bloomsbury, 2005)
A Companion to the Book of Margery Kempe (Boydell, 2004), co-edited with Katherine J Lewis
Inquisition and Power: Catharism and the Confessing Subject in Medieval Languedoc (University of Pennsylvania Press, 2001)
History: A Very Short Introduction (Oxford, 2000)

References

External links 
John H. Arnold. academia.edu
The Historian's Many Hats. BBC History Trails.
The Big Question: What is history? Open University.

1969 births
Academics of Birkbeck, University of London
Professors of Medieval History (Cambridge)
Academics of the University of East Anglia
Alumni of the University of York
British medievalists
Cultural historians
British historians of religion
Historiographers
King's College, Cambridge
Living people
Social historians